Charles Wesley Clabaugh (August 15, 1900 – March 23, 1983) was an American educator, businessman, and politician.

Clabaugh was born in Lerna, Coles County, Illinois. He graduated from Urbana High School in Urbana, Illinois. He received his bachelor's degree in education from Eastern Illinois University and taught school in Lerna, Illinois and Farmington, Illinois. Clabaugh owned the Champaign Weather Strip Company in Champaign, Illinois. Clabaugh served in the Illinois House of Representatives from 1939 until 1974 and was a Republican. Clabaugh died at a nursing home in Champaign, Illinois.

Notes

1900 deaths
1983 deaths
People from Champaign, Illinois
People from Coles County, Illinois
Eastern Illinois University alumni
Schoolteachers from Illinois
Businesspeople from Illinois
Republican Party members of the Illinois House of Representatives